The 2011 Porsche Mobil 1 Supercup season was the 19th Porsche Supercup season. It began on 8 May at Turkey's Istanbul Park and finished on 13 November at the Yas Marina Circuit in the United Arab Emirates, after eleven races.

Teams and drivers

Race calendar and results

Championship standings

Drivers' Championship

† — Drivers did not finish the race, but were classified as they completed over 90% of the race distance.

Teams' Championship

References

External links
The Porsche Mobil 1 Supercup website
Porsche Mobil 1 Supercup Online Magazine

Porsche Supercup seasons
Porsche Supercup